Lvl. 1 is the debut studio album by the band Last Chance to Reason. The album heavily references video games, especially Super Metroid. Song titles include "Escape From Brinstar", "Kraid Ain't Got Shit On Me", and "Destroy Mother Brain" (references to Nintendo's Super Metroid), and "Maddens for Noobz" (referencing the John Madden series of video games).

The album cover features artwork based on Super Metroid, with a male character on the cover showing some appearance similarities to that of Samus Aran.

Producer Jamie King commented on how "the album sounds like the group is playing Metroid across each song." King likened the sound to "aliens taking over the world," and the band embraced the theme.

A video was  released for "Get Awesome" in 2008.

Track listing

Personnel
Bob Delaney – lead vocals
A.J. Harvey – guitar
Chris Corey – bass
Brian Palmer – keyboards
Evan Sammons – drums

References

2007 debut albums
Last Chance to Reason albums
Tribunal Records albums
Albums produced by Jamie King (record producer)